William Russell (28 August 1859 – 31 October 1937) was a Conservative Party politician in the United Kingdom.

He was the son of George Russell. He was a solicitor in Bolton, Lancashire, retiring as the head of his firm in 1920. He was Mayor of Bolton for 1921–22 and a Member of Parliament (MP) for Bolton from 1922 to 1923.

References

External links
 
 William Russell at http://www.boltonsmayors.org.uk/

1859 births
1937 deaths
Conservative Party (UK) MPs for English constituencies
Mayors of Bolton
UK MPs 1922–1923
Conservative Party (UK) mayors